This article lists the oldest buildings in the Commonwealth of Massachusetts in the United States of America, including the oldest houses in Massachusetts and any other surviving structures. Some dates are approximate (indicated with a "") and based on architectural studies and historical records, while other dates are based on dendrochronology. All entries should include citation with reference to: 17th century architectural features; a report by an architectural historian; or dendrochronology. Sites on the list are generally from the First Period of American architecture. Only First Period houses built prior to 1728 are suitable for inclusion on this list or the building must be the oldest of its type.

The Fairbanks House (built 1641) is the oldest house verified using dendrochronology, followed by the James Blake House (built in 1661), but most First Period structures in Massachusetts have not yet been tested with dendrochronology surveys.

Verified through survey
The following structures have been verified using dendrochronology or some other type of architectural survey.

Estimates 
The following structures are claimed to have been built at or around the time attested.

See also
 List of historic houses in Massachusetts
 Oldest buildings in the United States
 First Period houses in Ipswich, Massachusetts

Notes

References

Further reading

Massachusetts
Architecture in Massachusetts
Oldest
Colonial architecture in Massachusetts
Massachusetts history-related lists